Driclor is a strong anti-perspirant manufactured by Stiefel Laboratories (UK) and produced in Sligo, Ireland. Driclor is similar to other strong anti-perspirants using 20% aluminium chloride hexahydrate as the active ingredient, however, the water content and roll-on dispenser may cause skin irritancy as water / perspiration can break down the active ingredient to produce hydrochloric acid.

Driclor is sold only as a roll-on application bottle. It has a pharmalogical classification of 'anti-perspirant'.  The packaging and bottle are in white with stripes and wording in blue colour.

References

Perfumes
Goods manufactured in the Republic of Ireland
Sligo (town)